Vadeqan (also Romanized as Vādeqān; also known as Bādgān and Bādqūn) is a village in Kuh Dasht Rural District, Neyasar District, Kashan County, Isfahan Province, Iran. At the 2006 census, its population was 290, in 122 families.

This village is Neighborhood of Van from West and Sar in east and with 200 population. Most of people are farmer and shepherd.
often women and girls of the village traditionally produce carpet in recent years.

Vadeghan is surrounded by mountains and located in a narrow valley. village agricultural productions are walnut, almond, Rose and Mohammadi flower, Plum, Berry and wild berry, cucumber, corn and other fruits . the country industry related to agricultural and Honey production and Rose-water production and other crafts like carpet production.

The nature of village is covered by buttonwood, willow, walnut ، almond trees, The Village has Television and Mobile coverage and all homes has land line phone. streets and alleys covered by asphalt. a river passed from middle of village and all of the year is dry and only in spring and winter may have some water. Local games include abdeh, pel and chafto, haft sang (7 stone), these games are like american rugby game. soccer and volleyball is popular between youths and every year matches between villages to be held in noorouz holiday (20-30 March).

You can see vadeghan pictures from google earth and panaromio .

References 

Populated places in Kashan County